Nevados de Poquis is a mountain in the Andes of Chile, close to the border with Argentina. It has a height of 5756 metres, and is located north of Paso de Jama and southeast of Zapaleri.

References

See also
List of mountains in the Andes

Mountains of Chile
Landforms of Antofagasta Region